Siah Push (also Romanized as Sīāh Pūsh, Seyāh Pūsh, Sīyāh Pūsh, and Siyapush) is a village in Khandan Rural District, Tarom Sofla District, Qazvin County, Qazvin Province, Iran. At the 2006 census, its population was 265, in 97 families.

References 

Populated places in Qazvin County